The year 1737 in science and technology involved some significant events.

Astronomy
 May 28 – The planet Venus passes in front of Mercury. The event is witnessed during the evening by amateur astronomer John Bevis at the Royal Greenwich Observatory in England.

Botany
 February 27 – French scientists Henri-Louis Duhamel du Monceau and Georges-Louis Leclerc de Buffon publish the first study correlating past weather conditions with an examination of tree rings.
 Elizabeth Blackwell's A Curious Herbal, with her own colour illustrations, is published in London.

Geology
 Francesco Serao is the first person to use the word lava in connection with extruded magma in a short account of the eruption of Mount Vesuvius which took place between May 14 and June 4.
 October 11 – An earthquake in Calcutta, India is said to have caused 300,000 deaths; this is now in question: it was probably a cyclone, with deaths estimated at 3,000.
 October 16 – An earthquake with an estimated magnitude of 9.3 strikes offshore of the Kamchatka Peninsula.

Mathematics
 Divergence of the sum of the reciprocals of the primes proved by Leonhard Euler.

Technology
 John Harrison is given an award from the longitude prize to continue his work on development of a stable marine chronometer in England.

Publications
 Venetian polymath Francesco Algarotti publishes Newtonianism for Ladies, or Dialogues on Light and Colours (Neutonianismo per le dame).

Awards
 Copley Medal: John Belchier

Births
 August 14 – Charles Hutton, English mathematician (died 1823)
 September 9 – Luigi Galvani, Italian physicist (died 1798)

Deaths

References

 
18th century in science
1730s in science